Andrew Park FRSA (born in south London, United Kingdom) is an English animator best known for making a 14-part series of 10-minute whiteboard animations for the Royal Society of Arts's channel theRSAorg which became the No.1 nonprofit channel worldwide with 46 million views.

RSA Animate
Andrew Park created the original concept and design for the RSA Animate cartoon series that has transferred the contents of RSA speeches and books to the medium of (hand-drawn) cartoon animations.

The first whiteboard animation drawn by Andrew Park in the RSA Animate series was based on Stein Ringen's Book, "The Economic Consequences of Mr Brown" given as a speech delivered for RSA.

The most recently drawn is based on a 500-page book by psychiatrist Iain McGilchrist on the topic of the divided (human) brain.

Other notable work 
Andrew Park was chosen by Bill Gates to illustrate his Gates Foundation lecture on the power of vaccines. Since his work on the RSA Animates series, Andrew Park has gone on to create further animations for the RSA and other high-profile organizations. Created at his animation company Cognitive, these have reached wide audiences and appeared on national media outlets.

References

External links
Series of 10-minute animations listed on the Royal Society of Arts website's  page
About Andrew Park at the Cognitive website
Other projects by Cognitive at the Cognitive website
The video on the power of vaccines (for the Gates Foundation)

English animators
English cartoonists
Whiteboard animation
Living people
Year of birth missing (living people)